Paecilomyces fulva is a plant pathogen that causes Byssochlamys rot on strawberries.

References

External links

Fungal strawberry diseases
Fungi described in 1971
Trichocomaceae